Douglas Pereira may refer to:

Douglas Donato Pereira (1991–2016), Brazilian drug lord
Douglas (footballer, born August 1990) (Douglas Pereira dos Santos), Brazilian footballer